Putbus is a narrow and standard gauge train station in the town of Putbus, Mecklenburg-Vorpommern, Germany. The station lies on the Bergen auf Rügen–Lauterbach Mole railway and the Rügen narrow-gauge railway. The train services between Bergen auf Rügen and Lauterbach Mole are operated by Pressnitztalbahn. Rail service between Putbus and Göhren is operated by Rügensche Bäderbahn.

Train services 
The station is served by the following service(s):

 Regional services  Rostock - Velgast - Stralsund - Lietzow - Binz
 Regional services  Lauterbach Mole - Putbus - Binz LB - Sellin Ost - Göhren

References 

TrainStation
Railway stations in Mecklenburg-Western Pomerania
Railway stations in Germany opened in 1889
Buildings and structures in Vorpommern-Rügen